Centreville Historic District or Centerville Historic District may refer to:
 Centreville Historic District (Centreville, Alabama), listed on the NRHP in Alabama
 Centreville Historic District (Centreville, Delaware), listed on the NRHP in Delaware
Centerville Historic District (Centerville, Indiana), listed on the NRHP in Indiana
 Centreville Historic District (Centreville, Maryland), listed on the NRHP in Maryland
Centerville Historic District (Barnstable, Massachusetts), listed on the NRHP in Massachusetts
 Centreville Historic District (Centreville, Mississippi), listed on the NRHP in Mississippi
Centerville Historic District (Centerville, Ohio), listed on the NRHP in Ohio
Centerville Historic District (Centerville, Pennsylvania), listed on the NRHP in Pennsylvania
Centreville-Fentress Historic District, Chesapeake, VA, listed on the NRHP in Virginia